Charles Albert II, Prince of Hohenlohe-Waldenburg-Schillingsfürst (21 February 1742 – 14 June 1796) was the 3rd Prince of Hohenlohe-Waldenburg-Schillingsfürst from 1793 to 1796.

Life 
Charles Albert II was the only child of Charles Albert I, Prince of Hohenlohe-Waldenburg-Schillingsfürst (1719–1793) and his first wife Princess Sophie Wilhelmine of Löwenstein-Wertheim-Rochefort (1721-1749), a daughter of Dominic Marquard, Prince of Löwenstein-Wertheim-Rochefort.

On 19 May 1761, he married as his first wife his cousin Princess Leopodine of Löwenstein-Wertheim-Rochefort (1739–1765), daughter of his mother's brother Charles Thomas, 3rd Prince of Löwenstein-Wertheim-Rochefort, by who he had two children:

Prince Franz of Hohenlohe-Waldenburg-Schillingsfürst, died at the age of two months
A Princess who was born and died on 2 June 1765

Princess Leopodine died a week later for the consequences of childbirth.

On 15 August 1773 he married his second wife the Hungarian Baroness Judith Reviczky de Revisnye (1751-1836) by whom he had the following children:

Princess Maria Josepha of Hohenlohe-Waldenburg-Schillingsfürst (1774–1824) married Count Maximilian Joseph von Holnstein, a grandchild of Charles VII, Holy Roman Emperor by his mistress Maria Caroline Charlotte von Ingenheim and had issue
Charles Albert III, 4th Prince of Hohenlohe-Waldenburg-Schillingsfürst (1776-1843) successor to his father, married twice, first time to Princess Auguste von Isenburg-Büdingen-Birstein (1779-1803), second time to Princess Leopoldine zu Fürstenberg (1791-1844) and had issue from both marriages
Prince Joseph of Hohenlohe-Waldenburg-Schillingsfürst (1777–1800)
Princess Maria Theresia of Hohenlohe-Waldenburg-Schillingsfürst (1779–1819) married Count Moritz von Fries and had issue
Princess Franziska of Hohenlohe-Waldenburg-Schillingsfürst (1780–1783)
Prince Albert of Hohenlohe-Waldenburg-Schillingsfürst (1781–1805)
Princess Antoinette of Hohenlohe-Waldenburg-Schillingsfürst (1783–1803)
Princess Friederike of Hohenlohe-Waldenburg-Schillingsfürst (born and died in June 1785)
Princess Eleonore of Hohenlohe-Waldenburg-Schillingsfürst (1786–1849) unmarried
Franz Joseph, 5th Prince of Hohenlohe-Schillingsfürst (1787–1841) founder of the branch of the Dukes of Ratibor and Princes of Corvey, married Princess Konstanze of Hohenlohe-Langenburg 
Princess Karoline of Hohenlohe-Waldenburg-Schillingsfürst (1789–1799)
Princess Gabriele of Hohenlohe-Waldenburg-Schillingsfürst (1791–1863) married Baron Karl von Brinkmann (1789-1859)
Prince Alexander of Hohenlohe-Waldenburg-Schillingsfürst (1794–1849) a Roman Catholic priest

Ancestry

Sources 
Karl Albrecht II, Fürst zu Hohenlohe-Waldenburg in Schillingsfürst

1742 births
1796 deaths
House of Hohenlohe